Dayneko is a surname. Notable people with the surname include:

Ken Daneyko (born 1964), Canadian ice hockey player
 Viktoria Dayneko (born 1987), Russian singer, songwriter and actress

See also
Deyneka